The Omaha Rockets were a semi-pro, independent Negro league baseball team in Omaha, Nebraska from (1947-1949). 

Gene Collins and Baseball Hall of Fame member Bob Gibson both began their careers with the Omaha Rockets. Hall of Fame pitcher Satchel Paige spent his last season playing with the Rockets. Pro Football Hall of Fame member  Dick Night Train Lane also played briefly for the Rockets after graduating high school.

See also 
 African Americans in Omaha, Nebraska
 Sports in Omaha, Nebraska

References

External links 
 "A History of the Omaha Rockets Independent Black Baseball Team" by Adam Fletcher Sasse for NorthOmahaHistory.com

African-American history in Omaha, Nebraska
Negro league baseball teams
Defunct baseball teams in Nebraska
Baseball teams disestablished in 1949
Baseball teams established in 1947